Norman is a British comedy television series which was originally broadcast on ITV in 1970. It starred Norman Wisdom as a man who quits his job with the Inland Revenue out of boredom to find a new more exciting life, but runs into chaos at whatever job he turns his hand to. All episodes are now believed to be lost.

It marked Wisdom's return to television after more than a decade as a film star. He followed it with two further ITV sitcoms Nobody Is Norman Wisdom (1973) and A Little Bit of Wisdom (1974-1976).

Partial cast
 Norman Wisdom as Norman Wilkins
 Sally Bazely as  Mrs. Tate
 David Lodge as Frank Baker

References

Bibliography
 I.Q. Hunter & Laraine Porter. British Comedy Cinema. Routledge, 2012.
 Jon E. Lewis & Penny Stempel. Cult TV: The Comedies : the Ultimate Critical Guide. Pavilion, 1998.

External links
 

1970 British television series debuts
1970 British television series endings
1970s British comedy television series
ITV sitcoms
English-language television shows
Television shows produced by Associated Television (ATV)